Exotidendriidae is a family of trematodes belonging to the order Plagiorchiida.

Genera:
 Exotidendrium Mehra, 1935
 Renivermis Blair, Purdie & Melville, 1989
 Simhatrema Chattopadhyaya, 1971

References

Plagiorchiida